Devaru Bekagiddare is a 2019 Kannada film, written and directed by Kenja Chethan Kumar.

Plot
A joyous drive back home from a wedding turns into a disaster as the driver loses control and the vehicle crashes leading to the death of all the people in the vehicle except for a baby. Ranganna, a local resident of the village takes responsibility of the baby whom he names Appu. Appu is brought up by Ranganna and is left devastated on his death. Keeping in mind Ranganna's teachings and the daily incidents with him, he sets on a journey to find that particular person who can be the bridge between him and God in order to find his true parents.

Cast 
S. Shivaram
 Anoop P. Doddmane
 Sathyanath
 Prasad Vashist
 Raj Prajwal

Accolades

References

External links 
 
 Trailer on Youtube
 On Vijayakarnataka
 On Balkaninews
 On Facebook
 NewsFirst Kannada on Youtube
 On Kannadaprabha
 On Prajapragathi
 On FilmiBeat Kannada
 On Filmgappa
 On Cinisuddi
 On Udupixpress
 On UniIndia Kannada

2010s Kannada-language films